William Bedford Sr. House is a historic home located at Evansville, Indiana. It was built in 1873, and is a two-story brick dwelling with English influences.  It features projecting polygonal bays and a one-story, full width front porch on four piers.

It was added to the National Register of Historic Places in 1978.

References

Houses on the National Register of Historic Places in Indiana
Houses completed in 1873
Houses in Evansville, Indiana
National Register of Historic Places in Evansville, Indiana